Jumpin' Jack Flash is a 1986 American comedy film starring Whoopi Goldberg. The film was directed by Penny Marshall in her theatrical film directorial debut. The soundtrack has two versions of the song "Jumpin' Jack Flash": the original by the Rolling Stones, and a remake by Aretha Franklin in the end credits. Franklin's version was not on the film's soundtrack album but was released as a single.

Plot
Terry Doolittle is a computer operator at a Manhattan bank. Though a good employee, well-liked by her co-workers, she is often chastised by her no-nonsense, imperious boss, James Page, who has little patience for Terry's unorthodox work ethics.

One evening as the rest of the co-workers are saying goodbye to their friend Jackie, who is going on maternity leave, Terry receives the message "Knock, Knock" on her screen and is contacted by a man calling himself Jumping Jack Flash, a British Intelligence agent in Eastern Europe who is being pursued by the KGB. Terry solves his riddles and determines his password is B-flat, the key in which "Jumpin' Jack Flash" is written. Jack sends her to the British Consulate to deliver a coded message to its Department C. Terry delivers the message to a man named Jeremy Talbot, who seems puzzled by her message and claims there is no Department C.

The next night, Terry tells Jack of her encounter with Talbot and he is understandably concerned about the outcome. He asks her to go to his New York apartment to retrieve a frying pan, containing his CIA contacts, who will supply an exit strategy. Meanwhile, Marty Phillips joins the staff at the bank as Jackie's replacement.

A computer technician comes to repair her terminal, but when Terry questions his identity, he vanishes. After arriving at Jack's apartment and retrieving the frying pan, she notices that someone had entered and taken her picture, which is pinned to the front door. Shaken, she runs back outside to her taxi, only to find the technician from earlier is the driver. She knocks him out with the frying pan and flees.

Terry is unable to reach the first of four contacts on the frying pan, Peter Caen, but does reach Mark Van Meter, who meets her by the East River. He is stunned to learn of what has happened to Jack and that Terry is a civilian. As they continue to talk, Van Meter notices someone coming up behind them. He quickly pushes Terry into the river, just before he is shot dead.

Terry attends Van Meter's funeral, where she meets Jack's second contact Archer Lincoln, as well as Liz Carlson, wife of third contact Harry Carlson. Lincoln dismisses Terry, but Liz informs her that Harry is with Jack.

After talking with Terry that evening, Jack deduces Harry is dead, then asks Terry to break into the Consulate's computer. Terry gets the idea to use the Queen's   Anniversary Ball being held there as a cover and goes there disguised as a singer. Conning her way in, she runs into Liz, who runs interference for her when Talbot intercepts her and manages to reach the computer room and secure a contact for Jack. But the next night, while Terry is sending it, Talbot deactivates the computer link before Jack receives his contact's name. Terry goes to Liz's home to talk to her, only to discover she and her children are gone and the house is empty and deserted. She hurries out, but is cornered by a strange man and ushered to a nearby limousine where Archer Lincoln is waiting for her. Inside the car, Lincoln confirms Harry Carlson's death and tells Terry that Liz and her children have been moved from their homes and given new identities for their own safety. He then warns her to break off contact with Jack to save her life.

The following morning, Terry decides to try and contact Lady Sarah Billings, who is an old flame of Jack's and obtain a contact for Jack from her. While calling around for information from a nearby phone booth, Terry is abducted and literally dragged through the streets of Manhattan by a tow truck while still inside. She manages to escape only to be confronted by the technician from the previous nights and injected with truth serum. He manages to get a partial confession from her, but she traps him by pinning his arm inside of his car window and sending it into traffic. In a haze, she locates Sarah at Elizabeth Arden and makes an impassioned plea for her help. Sarah tells Terry she would rather let Jack be killed than risk losing face. A disgusted Terry excoriates her and leaves.

Sarah visits Terry at home, having had a change of heart, and gives her a contact, retrieved from her husbandthe Consul General. After transmitting the exit plan to Jack, Terry is captured by the KGB and learns that Talbot is a mole, who deceptively provided the contact for Jack, in reality a deadly trap. Terry escapes and flees to the bank to contact Jack.

Talbot and his KGB henchmen are already there, masquerading as British bankers. Talbot orders her to tell Jack that nothing is wrong, but she tricks Talbot into sitting in an unstable chair, then fights him to reach her computer. Though one of Talbot's henchmen opens fire on the office, sending her co-workers running for cover, Terry continues typing a warning to Jack. When Carl, Talbot's other henchman, moves to kill her, he is suddenly shot by Marty. Terry bites Talbot's groin to free herself, then sends the warning to Jack. Marty reveals that he is Peter Caen, the CIA contact on the frying pan, then sends Jack a safe exit strategy.

Terry waits at the restaurant where she and Jack plan to meet, but is despondent by the time Peter arrives, at closing, to say Jack was called away. The next morning, Terry's co-workers are excited that Mr. Page is being promoted and Terry will be taking over his position. Terry is still depressed, but receives a message on her terminal from Jack. Terry berates him, but when she slams her glasses down, Jack advises against it, and Terry realizes he can see her. She turns and sees Jack for the first time. He embraces her, then asks her to dinner. Her co-workers, including Mr. Page, greet Jack warmly, then the team  applauds the new couple as they leave.

Cast

In addition, a number of then current and future players from Saturday Night Live appeared in smaller roles, including Jon Lovitz, Phil Hartman (credited as Phil E. Hartmann), Jim Belushi and Michael McKean. Tracey Ullman appears in a cameo role, and the director’s daughter, Tracy Reiner, plays a secretary. Comedian Sam Kinison, who was dating director Penny Marshall at the time, was offered the role of Jack, but Whoopi Goldberg nixed the deal, causing Marshall and Kinison to end their relationship and starting a bitter feud between Kinison and Goldberg.

Production

Production of the film, originally conceived as a vehicle for Shelley Long, was problematic. The script was troubled and often was rewritten on the set. It began with Howard Zieff as director, but he was replaced early in the production by Penny Marshall.

Soundtrack

The soundtrack album was released on LP and cassette by Mercury Records, and later reissued on compact disc by Spectrum.

 "Set Me Free" - René & Angela (4:23)
 "A Trick of the Night" - Bananarama" (4:37)
 "Misled" - Kool & the Gang (4:21)  
 "Rescue Me" - Gwen Guthrie (4:32)
 "Hold On - Billy Branigan (4:04)
 "Jumpin' Jack Flash" - The Rolling Stones (3:37)
 "Window to the World" - Face to Face (3:21)
 "You Can't Hurry Love" - The Supremes (2:44)
 "Breaking the Code" - Thomas Newman (3:41)
 "Love Music" - Thomas Newman (2:47)

The original versions of "Set Me Free" (by the Pointer Sisters) and "Rescue Me" (by Fontella Bass) are heard in the film, rather than the covers on the soundtrack album.

Reception
Jumpin' Jack Flash received generally negative reviews from critics upon its release. Roger Ebert of the Chicago Sun-Times praised Goldberg's performance but felt that she was harnessed to "an exhausted screenplay—an anthology of old ideas and worn-out clichés." Vincent Canby of The New York Times blamed the failures of the film on its director, stating "Miss Marshall directs Jumpin' Jack Flash as if she were more worried about the decor than the effect of the performance." On Rotten Tomatoes, it has an approval rating of 27% based on reviews from 22 critics, with an average rating of 4/10. On Metacritic, the film received a score of 52 based on 13 reviews, indicating "mixed or average reviews".

Although it was not well received by critics, the film was a modest success at the box office, opening at the #3 spot and making nearly $30 million in domestic sales. Audiences polled by CinemaScore gave the film an average grade of "A" on an A+ to F scale.

Home media
The film was released on Blu-ray by Anchor Bay Entertainment. on May 28, 2013.

References

External links
 
 
 
 
 
 Review of Jumpin' Jack Flash at TVGuide.com

1986 films
1980s spy comedy films
1986 thriller films
20th Century Fox films
American comedy thriller films
American spy comedy films
1980s chase films
Techno-thriller films
1986 directorial debut films
Films about computing
Films about identity theft
Films directed by Penny Marshall
Films produced by Joel Silver
Films set in New York City
Films shot in New York City
Silver Pictures films
Films scored by Thomas Newman
Films with screenplays by Charles Shyer
1986 comedy films
1980s English-language films
1980s American films